Cemal Kütahya (6 December 1990 – 6 February 2023) was a Turkish handball player. He was captain of the Turkey national team.

Death 
Kütahya died alongside his five-year-old son in Antakya when the complex he lived in, Rönesans Rezidans, collapsed in the 2023 Turkey–Syria earthquake. He was 32.

References 

1990 births
2023 deaths
People from Antakya
Turkish male handball players
Victims of the 2023 Turkey–Syria earthquakes
Islamic Solidarity Games competitors for Turkey